The Community of the Holy Family (CHF) is an Anglican religious order of nuns, originally founded in the Church of England, but now active in Italy and the United States.

History

In England

In origin, the community was formed of well educated young women who wished to commit themselves to educational work and evangelism. Three of the four original members, who were admitted as novices in August 1896, were graduates of Newnham College, Cambridge; one of these was Agnes Mason, the Mother Foundress.

The focus of the community's work was in London and the south-east of England, with convents and schools in the capital and in both Kent and Sussex. There was also a small branch house at Cambridge for sisters wishing to study. At Holmhurst St Mary, Baldslow, St Leonards-on-Sea in East Sussex, the sisters ran a girls' school, St Mary's School, from the 1930s to 1981. Its best-known pupil was Joanna Lumley.

From 1937, a daughter house was located at Peakirk, near Peterborough, attached to the ancient hermitage of St Pega, for those Sisters wishing to follow a more contemplative form of the religious life, although the Order's principal charism was of outreach, not enclosure. Sister Dilys left the Community at the Reverend Mother's request in 1968 and joined the more contemplative and enclosed Community of the Sisters of the Love of God at Fairacres in Oxford.

Overseas
The Community eventually expanded overseas and ran a teacher training college, All Saints' College, at Nainital in India  (1915–45).

Decline
In January 1997 the last remaining three sisters moved to Malling Abbey in Kent and lived in the gatehouse, alongside the resident Benedictine community. Two of the sisters died in 2002 and 2006, leaving just Sr Jean Beare CHF. The community closed with the death of Sr Jean on 27 November 2010.

Sister Julia Bolton Holloway, educated by the nuns of the Community, with a doctorate in Medieval Studies from Berkeley, joined them for their final four years at Holmhurst St Mary, and following the closure of the Order she continues the ethos of the Mother Foundress for education and ecumenism, as a solitary hermit in Florence, Italy. Subsequently, she developed a teaching ministry amongst gypsy families around Florence.

Revival

In April 2020, with permission of Sister Julia Bolton Holloway and the Diocese of Chichester, Sister Abigail Lilly rechartered the order in the Diocese of West Virginia in the Episcopal Church (United States). The revived Order seeks to develop a range of teaching and educational ministries. Sister Julia Bolton Holloway, still living and working in Italy, is now the Mother Superior of the Order.

External links
 Official website

References

Anglican orders and communities
Anglican religious orders established in the 19th century